Jan Eugeniusz Ludwig Zumbach  (14 April 1915, Ursynów, Congress Poland, Russian Empire – 3 January 1986, France) was a Polish-Swiss fighter pilot who became an ace and squadron commander during the Second World War. During the Cold War, he became a mercenary in Africa and played a key role in forming the air forces of the breakaway states of Katanga and Biafra.

Early years
The son of Eugeniusz Zumbach and Halina née Gorzechowska from a family of landowners hailing from the region of Płock. Zumbach was registered as a Swiss citizen (his paternal grandfather of Swiss origin settled in Poland at the end of the 19th century). He was born in Ursynów, and grew up in Bobrowo. In 1935, he graduated the Marshal Stanisław Małachowski High School in Płock. He joined the Polish Army in 1935 and served as an infantryman until 1936 when he transferred to the Polish Air Force.  After graduating the Polish Air Force Officer Training Center No. 1 in Dęblin in 1938 he was posted to 111 Eskadra Myśliwska.

Second World War
Zumbach did not fly during the German invasion of Poland due to a broken leg from a flying accident during the summer of 1939. He returned to his unit only to be evacuated to France via Romania. While in France, Zumbach flew the Morane 406 and Curtiss Hawk 75 with GCII/55. On 10 June, he was one of several pilots shot down by Bf 109s, but escaped unscathed. On 18 June 1940, he travelled to England by boat and on 2 August was posted as one of the founding members of the newly formed No. 303 Polish Fighter Squadron.

During the Battle of Britain, Zumbach scored eight victories and one probable, mostly against Messerschmitt Bf 109 fighters. Zumbach was shot down by a JG 3 Bf 109 over Dover on 9 May 1941 when returning from a mission, but he was again able to bail out unharmed.

Zumbach became one of the first Allied pilots to engage in combat with a German Focke-Wulf Fw 190, which he damaged; in return, his aircraft was damaged by a "single radial-engined fighter" on 13 October 1941. In December 1941, Zumbach was posted to 58 OTU, and in March 1942 returned to 303 Squadron as a flight commander. In May, he was promoted to squadron leader and took command of the squadron, a post Zumbach held from 19 May 1942 until 30 November 1943.

During this period, Zumbach flew three Supermarine Spitfire VBs, serial numbers BM144, EP594 and EN951. All these aircraft carried the same code, RF-D, "RF" being the squadron code for 303 Squadron and "D" the individual aircraft code. All three aircraft carried a cartoon of Donald Duck on the port side of the fuselage, slightly forward of the cockpit. Zumbach's victory tally was marked with German crosses under the cockpit on the port side; confirmed kills were outlined in white, probable kills in red, and damaged aircraft with no outline.

After handing over command of 303 Squadron to Squadron Leader Bieńkowski, Zumbach spent a year in staff appointments, including the Polish Air Force Staff College. He returned to flying duties as the commander of the 2nd Polish Air Wing, No 133 Wing. On 25 September 1944, he scored his final victory of the war, a probable kill over a JG 26 Fw 190 over Arnhem.

On 30 January 1945, Zumbach was posted to HQ, No. 84 Group. While flying an Auster that was used to visit units under the Group's command, he made a navigational error and ran out of fuel. He force-landed in enemy territory and spent the final month of the war as a prisoner of war.

Zumbach's final victory tally was 12 (and two shared) confirmed kills, five probables and one damaged.

Post-Second World War

Zumbach was demobilised in October 1946 but continued to fly for a living.  Under a Swiss passport, he flew contraband around Southern Europe and the Middle East.

In January 1962, Zumbach was contracted to organise and command Avikat, the air force of Congolese breakaway state of Katanga, commanding it until December 1962.  He went on to deal in second-hand aircraft before again becoming a mercenary in 1967, as he organised and commanded the air force of Biafra, flying the B-26 Invader, using the nom de guerre of John Brown. Based in Enugu, he became well-known among the locals. During that time, he also partook in Biafran air force raids, including killing a Nigerian army chief of staff during an attack on Markudi airfield he led.

In 1975, Zumbach published his autobiography, originally available in French under the title Mister Brown: Aventures dans le ciel, it was subsequently published in German, English under the title On Wings of War: My Life as a Pilot Adventurer, and Polish under the title Ostatnia walka: Moje życie jako lotnika, przemytnika i poszukiwacza przygód. (The final battle: My life as a pilot, smuggler, and adventurer).

Zumbach died in unclear circumstances on 3 January 1986 in France, and was buried at Powązki Military Cemetery in Warsaw, Poland. The investigation into his death was closed by order of the French authorities without public explanation.

Decorations
Virtuti Militari Crosses are the most prestigious Polish military awards.

 Virtuti Militari, Silver Cross 
 Cross of Valour (Poland), four times
 Distinguished Flying Cross (United Kingdom) & Bar

In popular culture

Jan Zumbach was portrayed by Iwan Rheon in the 2018 film Hurricane: 303 Squadron.

References

Notes

Bibliography

 Matusiak, Wojtek.  Zumbach's Donalds.  Rossagraph.  .
 Olson, Lynne and Stanley Cloud. A Question of Honor:  the Kościuszko Squadron in World War II. New York: Random House, 2003. .
 Shores, Christopher and Clive Williams. Aces High. London: Grub Street, 1994. .
 Zumbach, Jan. Ostatnia Walka (The Final Battle). Warsaw: Echo, 2000. .
 Zumbach, Jean (sic). On Wings of War: My Life as a Pilot Adventurer. London: Corgi, 1977. .

Further reading
 Tadeusz Jerzy Krzystek, Anna Krzystek: Polskie Siły Powietrzne w Wielkiej Brytanii w latach 1940-1947 łącznie z Pomocniczą Lotniczą Służbą Kobiet (PLSK-WAAF). Sandomierz: Stratus, 2012, p. 644. 
 Jerzy Pawlak: Absolwenci Szkoły Orląt: 1925-1939. Warszawa: Retro-Art, 2009, p. 191. 
 Piotr Sikora: Asy polskiego lotnictwa. Warszawa: Oficyna Wydawnicza Alma-Press. 2014, p. 182-187. 
 Józef Zieliński: Asy polskiego lotnictwa. Warszawa: Agencja lotnicza ALTAIR, 1994, p. 16-17. ISBN 83862172. 
 Józef Zieliński: Lotnicy polscy w Bitwie o Wielką Brytanię. Warszawa: Oficyna Wydawnicza MH, 2005, p. 230-231.

External links

 Battle of Britain Memorial Flight 2007 Official Program. See BBMF official webpage.

1915 births
1986 deaths
Military personnel from Warsaw
Burials at Powązki Military Cemetery
Polish mercenaries
Polish World War II flying aces
Polish prisoners of war
Royal Air Force officers
Smugglers
Polish people of Swiss descent
The Few
Recipients of the Silver Cross of the Virtuti Militari
Recipients of the Distinguished Flying Cross (United Kingdom)
Recipients of the Cross of Valour (Poland)
Military personnel of the Nigerian Civil War
Royal Air Force pilots of World War II
Polish Royal Air Force pilots of World War II
People of the State of Katanga
People of the Congo Crisis
Polish emigrants to France